The 1998 Philippine Basketball Association (PBA) Commissioner's Cup was the second conference of the 1998 PBA season. It started on May 22 and ended on August 14, 1998. The tournament is an Import-laden format, which requires an import or a pure-foreign player for each team with a 6'8" height limit.

Format
The following format will be observed for the duration of the conference
The teams were divided into 2 groups.

Group A:
San Miguel Beermen
Ginebra Kings
Pop Cola 800s
Mobiline Phone Pals

Group B:
Formula Shell Zoom Masters
Alaska Milkmen
Purefoods TJ Hotdogs
Sta. Lucia Realtors

Teams in a group will play against each other once and against teams in the other group twice; 11 games per team; Teams are then seeded by basis on win–loss records. Ties are broken among point differentials of the tied teams. Standings will be determined in one league table; teams do not qualify by basis of groupings.
The top two teams will automatically qualify to the semifinals, while the next four teams will have a crossover quarterfinal round.
Quarterfinals:
QF1: #3 vs. #6, with #3 having the twice-to-beat advantage
QF2: #4 vs. #5, with #4 having the twice-to-beat advantage
Best-of-five semifinals:
SF1: QF1 vs. #4
SF2: QF2 vs. #3
One-game third-place playoff: losers of the semifinals
Best-of-seven finals: winners of the semifinals

Elimination round

Team standings

Alaska was unbeaten in their first eight outings before losing to Mobiline and San Miguel in succession. Pop Cola clinched the 2nd seed with a superior quotient over San Miguel Beermen.

Bracket

Quarterfinals

(3) San Miguel vs. (6) Mobiline

(4) Purefoods vs. (5) Shell

Semifinals

(1) Alaska vs. (5) Shell

(2) Pop Cola vs. (3) San Miguel

Third-place playoff

Finals

References

External links
 PBA.ph

Commissioner's Cup
PBA Commissioner's Cup